The Erzberg mine is a large open-pit mine located in Eisenerz, Styria, in the central-western part of Austria, 60 km north-west of Graz and 260 km south-west of the capital, Vienna. Erzberg represents the largest iron ore reserves in Austria, having estimated reserves of 235 million tonnes of ore. The mine produces around 2,153,000 tonnes of iron ore per year. It is also the site of the annual Erzberg Rodeo hard enduro race.

References 

 

Iron mines in Austria
Greywacke zone
Geography of Styria
Buildings and structures in Styria
Economy of Styria